Pinus dalatensis, also known as Vietnamese white pine or Dalat pine, is a species of pine endemic to Indochina. Only recently confirmed from Laos, the population located within the Nakai-Nam Theun Biodiversity Conservation Area is the largest, at the lowest elevation, and the northernmost of the known populations of P. dalatensis.

Description
It is a member of the white pine group, Pinus subgenus Strobus, and like all members of that group, the leaves ('needles') are in fascicles (bundles) of five, with a deciduous sheath. The needles are finely serrated, and (3-)5–14 cm long.

It is most closely related to the blue pine Pinus wallichiana from the Himalaya.

Subspecies
It is divided into two subspecies:
Pinus dalatensis subsp. dalatensis. Da Lat region, between 11°50'N and 12°30'N. Cones 6–17 cm long.
Pinus dalatensis subsp. procera Businský. Central Vietnam, between 15°00'N and 16°20'N. Cones 13–23 cm long.

References

Further reading

External links
Conifers Around the World: Pinus dalatensis - THÔNG ĐÀ LẠT

dalatensis
Trees of Laos
Trees of Vietnam
Near threatened flora of Asia